Sinostidia is a small genus of east Asian sac spiders. It was first described by J. S. Zhang, H. Yu and S. Q. Li in 2021, and it has only been found in China.  it contains only two species: S. dujiao and S. shuangjiao.

See also
 List of Clubionidae species

References

Clubionidae genera
Spiders of China